The canton of Pont-de-Veyle is a former administrative division in eastern France. It was disbanded following the French canton reorganisation which came into effect in March 2015. It consisted of 12 communes, which joined the new canton of Vonnas in 2015. It had 13,162 inhabitants (2012).

The canton comprised 12 communes:

Bey
Cormoranche-sur-Saône
Crottet
Cruzilles-lès-Mépillat
Grièges
Laiz
Perrex
Pont-de-Veyle
Saint-André-d'Huiriat
Saint-Cyr-sur-Menthon
Saint-Genis-sur-Menthon
Saint-Jean-sur-Veyle

Demographics

See also
Cantons of the Ain department

References

Former cantons of Ain
2015 disestablishments in France
States and territories disestablished in 2015